The Nashville American Legion Building is a historic American Legion hall on Arkansas Highway 27 west of Main Street, in Nashville, Arkansas.  It is a single-story rubble-stone structure with vernacular Craftsman styling.  Notable features include exposed rafters under the eaves, and stone "buttressing" extending from the sides and corners of the building.  Built in 1930 by the Civil Works Administration, it is the only building in Nashville made out of this type of building material.

The building was listed on the U.S. National Register of Historic Places in 1990.

See also
National Register of Historic Places listings in Howard County, Arkansas

References

American Legion buildings
Clubhouses on the National Register of Historic Places in Arkansas
Nashville, Arkansas
National Register of Historic Places in Howard County, Arkansas
1930 establishments in Arkansas
Civil Works Administration
Cultural infrastructure completed in 1930
American Craftsman architecture in Arkansas